Rubukona cuprescens is a moth of the family Sesiidae. It is known from Mozambique.

References

Endemic fauna of Mozambique
Sesiidae
Lepidoptera of Mozambique
Moths of Sub-Saharan Africa
Moths described in 1919